West Down is a village in the county of Devon.

West Down may also refer to:

In Northern Ireland
The western part of County Down
West Down (Northern Ireland Parliament constituency), a county constituency from 1929–1972
West Down (UK Parliament constituency), a county constituency from 1885–1922

See also
West Yatton Down, a biological Site of Special Scientific Interest (SSSI) in Wiltshire, England
West Woodhay Down, a designated Site of Special Scientific Interest (SSSI) in Berkshire, England